The 2017 CONCACAF League Final was the final round of the 2017 CONCACAF League, the inaugural edition of the CONCACAF League, the secondary club football tournament organised by CONCACAF, the regional governing body of North America, Central America, and the Caribbean.

The final was contested in two-legged home-and-away format between Olimpia from Honduras and Santos de Guápiles from Costa Rica. The first leg was hosted by Olimpia at the Estadio Olímpico Metropolitano in San Pedro Sula on 19 October 2017, while the second leg was hosted by Santos de Guápiles at the Estadio Nacional de Costa Rica in San José on 26 October 2017.

With Santos de Guápiles winning the first leg and Olimpia winning the second leg, both by the score of 1–0, the tie finished 1–1 on aggregate, and Olimpia won 4–1 on a penalty shoot-out to win the title. As CONCACAF League winners, Olimpia qualified for the 2018 CONCACAF Champions League.

Teams

While Olimpia were the only team to have competed in all nine editions in the CONCACAF Champions League era since 2008, and would continue this streak if they won the final, Santos de Guápiles had never competed in the CONCACAF Champions League and had the chance to qualify for the first time.

Venues

Road to the final

Note: In all results below, the score of the finalist is given first (H: home; A: away).

Format
The final was played on a home-and-away two-legged basis, with the team with the better performance in previous rounds hosting the second leg.

If the aggregate score was tied after the second leg, the away goals rule would be applied, and if still tied, a penalty shoot-out would be used to determine the winner.

Performance ranking

Matches

First leg

Second leg

See also
2018 CONCACAF Champions League

References

External links

Final
2017
2017–18 in Costa Rican football
2017–18 in Honduran football
Sports competitions in San José, Costa Rica
International association football competitions hosted by Honduras
International association football competitions hosted by Costa Rica
Santos de Guápiles F.C. matches
C.D. Olimpia matches
October 2017 sports events in North America
21st century in San José, Costa Rica
Association football penalty shoot-outs